Golf was first featured in the Summer Olympic Games official programme in 1900 and 1904. A golf tournament was also to have been held in 1908 but was cancelled a few days before it was scheduled to start. At the IOC session in Copenhagen in October 2009, the International Olympic Committee (IOC) decided to reinstate the sport for the 2016 Summer Olympics. The International Golf Federation is governing body for golf at the Olympic Games. As of the 2016 Olympics, qualification is based primarily upon the Official World Golf Ranking (men) and Women's World Golf Rankings, with the top 15 of each gender automatically qualifying (with a limit of four per country), and then the highest ranked players from countries that had not yet already qualified two players.

Medal table
Sources:

Total

Men

Women

Events
1900
Men's individual
Women's individual
1904
Men's individual
Men's team
2016
Men's individual
Women's individual
2020
Men's individual
Women's individual

A men's individual tournament was planned for the 1908 London Games, but an internal dispute amongst British golfers led to them boycotting the event, leaving 1904 gold medallist George Lyon as the only competitor. Offered the gold medal by default, Lyon refused to accept it. Present day, the Olympic golf tournaments only consists of a men's individual stroke play and women's individual stroke play. There has been calls for the IGF and the IOC to consider adding a match play tournament or to open up the Olympic tournament to more golfers by using a different qualifying system than the World Golf Ranking.

Courses

Medal summary

Men's individual

Women's individual

Men's team

Participating nations
22 golfers competed in 1900. The 1904 tournament featured 77 golfers. Albert Lambert was the only golfer who competed both times; a total of 98 different golfers competed throughout the brief history of Olympic golf before it was brought back in 2016.

See also
 List of Olympic venues in golf

References

External links
International Olympic Committee results database

 
Olympic Games
Golf